Cleghorne may refer to:

Ellen Cleghorne (born 1965), American comedian and actress
Cleghorne!, American sitcom starring Ellen Cleghorne